Rally Norway 2007, the third round of the 2007 World Rally Championship season, was held on February 16 – 18 2007. Race headquarters were located in the town of Hamar.

Results

Retirements 
  Guy Wilks - went off the road (SS9);
  Toni Gardemeister - engine failure (after SS14);

Special Stages 
All dates and times are CET (UTC+1).

Championship standings after the event

Drivers' championship

Manufacturers' championship

External links

 Results on official site - WRC.com
 Results on eWRC-results.com
 Results on RallyBase.nl

Norway
2007
Rally